Nikolas Papadopoulos (born 22 April 1973) is a Greek Cypriot lawyer and politician. He has been Member of Parliament for Nicosia since 2006 and leader of centrist DIKO party since 2013. Papadopoulos chairs the parliamentary committee on Finance and Budget. He is the son of President Tassos Papadopoulos.

Family and education
Papadopoulos was born in Nicosia in 1973, the son of lawyer, politician and future president Tassos Papadopoulos and his wife Fotini. He studied law at University College London and was called to the bar at Inner Temple. During his time in London, he served as president of EFEK, the Cypriot students' federation in Britain. On his return to Cyprus, Papadopoulos began work at his father's firm.

Papadapoulos is married and has four children.

Political career
Padapoulos was elected to the House of Representatives as a DIKO MP for the Nicosia constituency in 2006. He was re-elected in 2011. He is the chairperson of the Committee on Finance and Budget. In 2013, Padapoulos replaced Marios Garoyian as president of DIKO.

References

1973 births
Living people
Members of the House of Representatives (Cyprus)
Leaders of political parties in Cyprus
Democratic Party (Cyprus) politicians